Fluorophosphate glass is a class of optical glasses composed of metaphosphates and fluorides of various metals. It is a variant of phosphate glasses. Fluorophosphate glasses are very unusual in nature. Fluorophosphate glasses have ultra-low theoretical loss of 0.001 dB/km, longer fluorescent lifetime of rare earths, lower coefficient of thermal expansion of ~13/°C.

Some fluorophosphate glasses are used as low dispersion glasses. Some show anomalous partial dispersion. One such glass is composed of Ba(PO3)2, Al(PO3)3, AlF3, and alkaline earth fluorides MgF2, CaF2, SrF2, and BaF2, with possible addition of titanium, sodium, potassium, and/or hydrogen. The components by wt.% are 0.5–3% Mg, 8–10% Ca, 12–20% Sr, 9–12% Ba, 7–9% Al, 5–9% P, 8–12% O, and 35–38% F.

Some doped fluorophosphate glasses are used in laser technology. They are attractive here for their small refractive index nonlinearity. Rare-earth elements are popular dopants. One of the applications is for optical amplifiers.

Exotic dopants like fullerenes and quantum dots can be employed.

Tungsten-doped tin-fluorophosphate glasses (SnO-SnF2-P2O5) can be used for hermetic sealing of organic light-emitting diodes and other devices.

See also

Thoriated glass

References

Glass compositions
Phosphates
Fluorides